Duetos (Duets) is a studio album by the Mexican recording artist Armando Manzanero. It was released by WEA on March 20, 2001. The album includes duets by Manzanero and several performers, including Olga Tañón, Alejandro Sanz, Edith Márquez, Ricardo Montaner, Lucero, Francisco Céspedes, Presuntos Implicados, Café Quijano, Miguel Bosé, Juan Pablo Manzanero and Carlos Cuevas. The album earned Manzanero a Latin Grammy Award for Best Pop Vocal Album, Duo or Group.

Track listing
This track listing adapted from Allmusic and liner notes.

References

2001 albums
Armando Manzanero albums
Spanish-language albums
Latin Grammy Award for Best Pop Album by a Duo or Group with Vocals
Vocal duet albums